A video vixen (also referred to as a hip hop honey or video girl) is a female model who appears in hip hop-oriented music videos.  From the 1990s to the early 2010s, the video vixen image was a staple in popular music, particularly within the genre of hip hop. The video vixen first came around in the late 1980s when the hip-hop culture began to emerge into its own lifestyle, although was most popular in American popular culture during the 1990s and 2000s. Many video vixens are aspiring actors, singers, dancers, or professional models. Artists and vixens have been criticized for allegedly contributing to the social degradation of black women.

Origin of the video vixen 
The video vixen is believed to have arrived around the late 80s when hip-hop was starting to take over as its own genre in the music industry. At this time women were used to create sex appeal in music videos while still being in the background. It wasn’t until the late 1990s when the women came to the center of many videos. The concept of the video vixen is seen to derive from the historical Jezebel stereotype that is typically placed upon black women. The term jezebel is used in reference to a hyper-sexual woman; she often is someone who is depicted as sexually promiscuous and uses her body to get what she wants. The video vixen is believed to be the modernization of the Jezebel stereotype. According to Meagan Ford it is an opportunity for women to use their features and sexuality in order to create wealth. The vixens were there to complete the male artist persona of having lots of money and lots of women available to them. The women not only had to please the directors and artists as they were also meant to please the audience. This concept sold because “The males wanted to see that and the girls wanted to be that”. This statement is made by Music Video Director Dr. Teeth who in the documentary also mentions how these women “had the curves, she had the face, and she looked like the chick that was around the way that you could get at.”

Social aspect
The work of video vixens and their portrayal in music videos have drawn criticism. Meagan Ford, Stephanie Stevenson, Kate Conrad, Travis Dixon, and Yuanyuan Zhang express concern on how video vixens are placed in subordinate and submissive roles while often depicted as sexual objects. These authors believe that these depictions place male artists in positions of power which they say contribute to the representation of males as the dominant gender. Models are depicted as sexual objects, signs of male power, and the use of derogatory language towards women such as “bitch” and “slut” by artist contributes to the narrative that women are the inferior sex.

In 2004, Nelly's video for his song "Tip Drill" came under particular criticism for its depiction and sexual objectification of women. While some people pointed out that the women who appeared in Nelly's video voluntarily chose to participate, others insisted that male rappers continue to sexually objectify hip hop models while denying that the hip hop artists' career is, at least in part, based on the exploitation of other people.

In 2005, former hip hop music video model Karrine Steffans authored the book Confessions of a Video Vixen, in which she depicts the degradation of women in the world of hip hop. The book's publisher describes it as "part tell-all, part cautionary tale." The book went on to be a best seller in the US.  Karrine Steffans was one of a few who decided to share her personal experience as a vixen with the world. Her book was set as the standard vixen experience by society because it was believed to confirm people's speculations about the industry. Steffans is just one example of a vixen and because of this vixens such as Gloria Velez and Melyssa Ford had a problem with her book. They explained how their experience wasn’t the same as hers and how she was essentially a nobody until the book was released. And her referencing of other vixens was an act of forcing her narrative on their experience. Another hip hop model, Candace Smith, said in an XXL interview, "what I've seen on [hip hop music video] sets is complete degradation."

The video vixens' effect on Black women 
The topic of video vixens have created a lot of debate on the representation of Black women, such as author Faatimah Soloman’s argument that it has contributed to the hyper-sexualization of black women. She explains in her article "The Exploitation Of Women Of Color In Music Videos Needs To End" how black women are deemed sexual beings due to their physical features. Video vixens are believed to be the reinforcement of these negative stereotypes placed upon black women. Often referred to as stereotypical tropes because of their glamorization of embodying the stereotypes typically placed on women of color. She expands her argument by mentioning how these stereotypes lead to exclusion of Black women in relation to their “social and intellectual contributions”, often because they are only praised for their bodies.

This idea also correlates with Nicole Heller’s explanation of Objectification theory and one- dimensional womanhood. These theories define the portrayal of black women in hip-hop as it aims to separate the female body from her personality in order to focus on just her body. Heller mentions how Nelly swiping a card through the rear end of a vixen in his Tip Drill music video visually represents the ideology of the Black woman's body being a commodity. The subculture of the video vixen represents black women and women of color as objects that can literally be bought with a credit card instead of human beings. Author Amanda Rodriguez however does mention how these women were considered to be a “luxury commodity”. Meaning that the artist and labels gave them a glamourized experience in return for their work. It was temporary for most but for the vixens who became famous they truly were able to get paid like the artist.

The video vixen is criticized for having a negative effect on women, as they are believed to set unrealistic beauty standards, and could have created the need to change themselves in order to fit said standards.

Female rappers as video vixens
Female rappers such as Lil' Kim and Trina got criticzed by T. Denean Sharpley-Whiting who called them a "peculiar place of cultural antipathy".

Female rappers who have shown themselves off as "video vixens" include Nicki Minaj, Trina, Eve, Rasheeda, Foxy Brown, Remy Ma, Da Brat, Jacki-O, Shawnna, Gangsta Boo, LoLa Monroe, Diamond from the hip-hop group Princess, and many others.

On the other hand, these artists use their body and sexuality to reclaim their own individuality and self. For instance, Minaj talks about how she is aware of her position as a black female rapper, and she is outspoken when it comes to empowering herself and other women. She also uses her body with the intent of dominating over the male expression of female sexuality, and she talks about how "it's Barbie, bitch!" has become her catchphrase to assert herself and her existence. Author Nicole Heller uses Nicki Minaj’s Anaconda music video (2014) as an example of how female artists are reclaiming their sexuality's and power. Anaconda is a song that seeks to embrace large behinds and curvy bodies. Minaj samples Sir Mix-A- Lot’s Baby Got Back with the intent of transforming the objectification of the female body and how curvy women specifically are objectified in the hip-hop industry. She uses her body in order to establish her dominance and portray how she is in full control of her body and sexuality.

Other artists of Afro-Caribbean origins like Cardi B (alongside Nicki Minaj as well) are analyzed to be using this hyper-sexual image as a way to assert their own existence and self-representation as Afro-Caribbean women who are sexy yet worthy of freedom, and it counters what could be oppressive norms that fit the respectability politics.

In parallel to that, the role of women in the hip hop world wasn't limited to only being video vixens. Two artists in the early era of hip hop, rapper Roxanne Shante and rap group Salt-N-Pepa, were well-known for rapping about defending the image of women. They were responding to male hip hop artists who habitually degrade women. Other artists such as Missy Elliott, Lauryn Hill, Erykah Badu and Queen Latifah advocated being strong independent black women. Moreover, according to Heller, they asserted their sexuality without being in a position of hyper-sexuality themselves.

American writer and activist Audre Lorde also spoke out for black girls who are considered video vixens, said: "If I didn't define myself for myself, I would be crunched into other people's fantasies for me and eaten alive."

See also
Misogyny in hip hop culture
Mami (hip hop)
Sexuality in music videos
Stereotypes of African Americans
Empowerment 
Women's empowerment
Hip Hop 
Black women in the American music industry
List of models in music videos
Intersectionality

References

Further reading
Thompson, Bonsu and Huang, Howard (August 4, 2004). "Eye Candy Hall of Fame". XXL Magazine. New York: Harris Publications. Retrieved on February 11, 2006.

Modeling (profession)
History of hip hop
African-American gender relations
Criticism of hip-hop